Gompholobium roseum is a species of flowering plant in the family Fabaceae and is endemic to the south-west of Western Australia. It is an erect shrub with pinnate leaves and yellow, pink or green, pea-like flowers with pink or green markings.

Description
Flowering occurs in October and the fruit is a cylindrical pod.

Taxonomy
Gompholobium roseum was first formally described in 2008 by Jennifer Anne Chappill in Australian Systematic Botany from specimens collected by Robert Royce near Watheroo National Park in 1971. The specific epithet (roseum) means "rosy", referring to the flowers.

Distribution
This pea is found in the Avon Wheatbelt, Geraldton Sandplains and Swan Coastal Plain biogeographic regions of south-western Western Australia.

Conservation status
Gompholobium roseum is classified as "Priority Two" by the Western Australian Government Department of Parks and Wildlife meaning that it is poorly known and from only one or a few locations.

References

roseum
Eudicots of Western Australia
Plants described in 2008